Orell Talk  Language Lab is a digital language learning software tool developed and distributed by Oréll Techno Systems (India) Pvt Ltd, which was founded by Saji Varghese Chameli in 2007. It is used by schools, colleges, universities and other educational institutions in more than 50 countries to teach languages. The software has four editions; Smart, Pro, Max and Corporate. It is provided with a teacher console and student consoles according to the requirement of the institution. The installation package includes the software, 5000 hours English study materials.

Features
Orell Talk Language Lab includes the following components:-

 ASL- Tool to assign speaking and listening activities to students
 Intercom- Enables two-way communication between the teacher and students
 Live Classroom- Performs live classes and allows evaluation of students' learning activities
 Lesson Studio-  Allows teacher to create study materials in video, audio and text format
 eWriter- To assign writing assignments to students
 eReader- To send reading assignments to individual or group of students
 Screen Viewer- Teacher can capture the students' screen and monitor their activities even without their knowledge
 Model Student- To select a student as model for other learners to view the assignments submitted by the model student
 Bill Board- To write a news or information for students
 Alert- An aid for students to call the teacher

Technology
Oréll Language Lab can be hosted onto the internet. It is designed to work on Windows and other operating systems.

References

https://web.archive.org/web/20100727141205/http://www.prestigegwl.org/Facilities.htm
https://www.instagram.com/p/Cn1PYwhr3MD/

External links
 

Language learning software